Johan Elfvengren (born 10 June 1994) is a Finnish ice hockey player. He is currently playing with Lahti Pelicans in the Finnish Liiga.

Elfvengren made his Liiga debut playing with Lahti Pelicans during the 2014–15 Liiga season.

References

External links

1994 births
Living people
Finnish ice hockey forwards
Lahti Pelicans players